This article provides information on candidates who stood for the 1961 Australian federal election. The election was held on 9 December 1961.

By-elections, appointments and defections

By-elections and appointments
On 9 April 1960, John Jess (Liberal) was elected to replace Richard Casey (Liberal) as the member for La Trobe.
On 9 April 1960, Bert James (Labor) was elected to replace H. V. Evatt (Labor) as the member for Hunter.
On 16 July 1960, Noel Beaton (Labor) was elected to replace Percy Clarey (Labor) as the member for Bendigo.
On 16 July 1960, Ray Whittorn (Liberal) was elected to replace Percy Joske (Liberal) as the member for Balaclava.
On 5 November 1960, John England (Country) was elected to replace John Howse (Liberal) as the member for Calare.
On 10 December 1960, Don Chipp (Liberal) was elected to replace Frank Timson (Liberal) as the member for Higinbotham.
On 28 September 1961, Gordon Davidson (Liberal) was appointed a South Australian Senator to replace Rex Pearson (Liberal).
Subsequent to the election, but prior to the new Senate taking its place:
On 8 February 1962, Gordon Davidson (Liberal) was appointed a South Australian Senator to replace Nancy Buttfield (Liberal). Davidson had been appointed to the Senate in 1961 but had not contested the 1961 election. Buttfield, a sitting Senator, had been elected to the place originally won by Rex Pearson in 1961, but resigned it in order to take up the long-term vacancy. Davidson's appointment expired on 30 June 1963.

Retiring Members and Senators

Labor
 George Lawson MP (Brisbane, Qld)
Senator John Armstrong (NSW)
Senator Don Cameron (Vic)
Senator Ben Courtice (Qld)
Senator Sid O'Flaherty (SA)
Senator Jim Sheehan (Vic)

Liberal
 Francis Bland MP (Warringah, NSW)
Senator John McCallum (NSW)
Senator Sir Neil O'Sullivan (Qld)
Senator Robert Wardlaw (Tas)

Country
 George Bowden MP (Gippsland, Vic)
 Len Hamilton MP (Canning, WA)
Senator Albert Reid (NSW)
Senator Agnes Robertson (WA)

House of Representatives
Sitting members at the time of the election are shown in bold text. Successful candidates are highlighted in the relevant colour. Where there is possible confusion, an asterisk (*) is also used.

Australian Capital Territory

New South Wales

Northern Territory

Queensland

South Australia

Tasmania

Victoria

Western Australia

Senate
Sitting Senators are shown in bold text. Tickets that elected at least one Senator are highlighted in the relevant colour. Successful candidates are identified by an asterisk (*).

New South Wales
Five seats were up for election. The Labor Party was defending one seat. The Liberal-Country Coalition was defending four seats. Senators Stan Amour (Labor), Ken Anderson (Liberal), James Arnold (Labor), Sir Alister McMullin (Liberal) and James Ormonde (Labor) were not up for re-election.

Queensland

Five seats were up for election. The Labor Party was defending two seats. The Liberal-Country Coalition was defending three seats. Senators Gordon Brown (Labor), Felix Dittmer (Labor), Roy Kendall (Liberal), Ted Maher (Country) and Ian Wood (Liberal) were not up for re-election.

South Australia

Six seats were up for election. One of these was a short-term vacancy caused by Liberal Senator Rex Pearson's death; this had been filled in the interim by Liberal Gordon Davidson. The Labor Party was defending two seats. The Liberal Party was defending four seats. Senators Arnold Drury (Labor), Keith Laught (Liberal), Clem Ridley (Labor) and Jim Toohey (Labor) were not up for re-election.

Tasmania

Five seats were up for election. The Labor Party was defending two seats. The Liberal Party was defending three seats. Senators Bill Aylett (Labor), George Cole (Democratic Labor), Elliot Lillico (Liberal), John Marriott (Liberal) and Justin O'Byrne (Labor) were not up for re-election.

Victoria

Five seats were up for election. The Labor Party was defending three seats. The Liberal-Country Coalition was defending one seat. The Democratic Labor Party was defending one seat. Senators John Gorton (Liberal), George Hannan (Liberal), Bert Hendrickson (Labor), Pat Kennelly (Labor) and Ivy Wedgwood (Liberal) were not up for re-election.

Western Australia

Five seats were up for election. The Labor Party was defending two seats. The Liberal Party was defending two seats. The Country Party was defending one seat. Senators George Branson (Liberal), Harry Cant (Labor), Joe Cooke (Labor), Tom Drake-Brockman (Country) and Malcolm Scott (Liberal) were not up for re-election.

Summary by party 

Beside each party is the number of seats contested by that party in the House of Representatives for each state, as well as an indication of whether the party contested Senate elections in each state.

See also
 1961 Australian federal election
 Members of the Australian House of Representatives, 1958–1961
 Members of the Australian House of Representatives, 1961–1963
 Members of the Australian Senate, 1959–1962
 Members of the Australian Senate, 1962–1965
 List of political parties in Australia

References
Adam Carr's Election Archive - House of Representatives 1961
Adam Carr's Election Archive - Senate 1961

1961 in Australia
Candidates for Australian federal elections